The Battle of Checkpoint Pasta, sometimes called the Battle of the Pasta Factory, was a firefight in Mogadishu between Italian troops and Somali rebels, and is remembered for being the first all-out battle involving the Italian Army since the end of the Second World War.

The battle took place near the Italian checkpoint called "Pasta", because it was located near an abandoned Barilla pasta factory across the intersection of Imperial Street and 21 October Street, after an ambush on Italian forces was set up by Somali rebels led by General Mohamed Aidid.

The Italian units eventually broke the encirclement and withdrew.

Context 
On July 2, 1993, during the development of "Operation Kangaroo 11", planned by the command "ITALFOR", Italian forces split into two mechanized columns to carry out a search for weapons in the Haliwaa district, a district north of Mogadishu. Some targets were located near an abandoned Barilla pasta factory, near which a checkpoint had been set up, on the crossroads between Via Imperiale and Strada 21 October, called "Pasta".

The operation 
The first column, called Alfa, came from the old port of Mogadishu while the second, Bravo, from the city of Balad, another important Italian garrison during the mission, was located about twenty kilometers from Mogadishu.

Once the patrol operation was over, the two columns went back to base. Serious unrest broke out in the area, among which snipers mingled. The situation deteriorated to such an extent for Somali law enforcement that the intervention by the Bravo column was necessary, which at that time was in the vicinity of the pasta factory along the Via Imperiale.

The militia ambush 
Some Italian VCC-1 Camillino armored personnel carriers stopped in front of barricades erected by the Somali militiamen. They were immobilized with anti-tank rockets while the surrounding streets were blocked with other barricades. In one of these, paratrooper Pasquale Baccaro died, hit in the leg by a rocket, while Sergeant Major Giampiero Monti was seriously injured in the abdomen and paratrooper Massimiliano Zaniolo received a bullet wound in his hand.

The rescue intervention of the Alfa column was therefore decided, equipped with eight M60 tanks, Fiat 6614 armored cars and seven B1 Centauro tank destroyers. Further support came from Agusta A129 Mangusta and Bell UH-1 Iroquois helicopters. Armored vehicle crews tried to protect other vehicles and injured comrades using onboard machine guns, while also trying to restart one of the damaged vehicles with men still patrolling the neighborhood; it was at this stage that the Raider Sergeant Stefano Paolicchi was mortally wounded while clearing a militias' dugout with an OD 82/SE hand grenade.

Heavy armament was used only on two occasions: an unspecified number of M60s from a company of the 32nd Tank Regiment from the 132nd Armored Brigade "Ariete" opened fire on containers that served as a shield for the militiamen, causing great losses, and one of the Mangustas destroyed an Iveco VM 90 seized by the Somali militias with a TOW missile, killing all the rebels aboard.

Among the men of the rescue column, the Second Lieutenant Andrea Millevoi, commander of a Centauro tank destroyer platoon of the 8th "Lancieri di Montebello" Regiment, was shot and killed as he leaned out of his vehicle to check out the area. A large number of civilians arrived and were used as human shields by the militiamen. The arrival of rescue armored vehicles allowed the soldiers under fire to withdraw.

Losses and aftermath 
The Italians lost three soldiers during that day of battle:
 Andrea Millevoi, Second Lieutenant of the regiment "Lancieri di Montebello", Gold medal for military valor;
 Stefano Paolicchi, Sergeant Major of the 9th Paratroopers Assault Regiment "Col Moschin", Gold medal for military valor;
 Pasquale Baccaro, Corporal of the 186º "Folgore" paratrooper regiment, Gold medal for military valor.

In addition, 22 were injured and an unknown number of Somali militiamen and civilians were killed or injured. In the 2008 documentary Checkpoint Pasta by director Andrea Bettinetti, Somali sources say 67 militiamen were killed and at least 103 were injured. 

Among the Italians wounded, there was also the then Second Lieutenant Gianfranco Paglia, paratrooper, who during the action was hit by three bullets while trying to rescue the crew of one of the immobilized armored cars. One bullet entered the lung which caused internal bleeding, and one hit the spinal cord which forced him to use a wheelchair afterwards. He was awarded the Gold Medal for military valor for the action. Despite having lost the use of his legs, he is still in service in the Italian Army. The paratrooper and Sergeant Major Giampiero Monti, seriously injured in the abdomen, was awarded the Silver Medal of Military Valor.

Other silver and bronze medals were awarded to various members of the Bersaglieri and helicopter pilots engaged in the action.

Reasons for the battle 
According to some reconstructions, never confirmed by official sources, the clashes erupted because the area of operations conducted by Italian forces was the refuge of General Mohammed Farah Aidid, one of the main Somali warlords and considered a major obstacle to reaching a peace agreement. The order from Aidid to his militiamen would have been to kick off the clashes, so as to allow him to flee the area. The situation would then escape the control of the general, degenerating from skirmishes to bloody gunfights. This version was supported by a Somali activist, on the occasion of a meeting that took place at the Vannucci military base in Livorno in the spring of 1994.

See also 

 Battle of Mogadishu (1993)

References

Bibliography

External links
 (In Italian) Checkpoint Pasta – History Channel documentary

Checkpoint Pasta
Italian Army
1993 in Somalia
Checkpoint Pasta
Checkpoint Pasta
Checkpoint Pasta
Somali Civil War